Kristine C. Lytton (née Alderson, born 1960) is an American politician.

Lytton was born in Illinois in 1960. She lives in Anacortes, Washington with her husband and family. She served on the Anacortes School Board. Lytton is a  member of the Democratic Party. She served on the Washington House of Representatives, from 2010 to 2019, representing the 40th district.

References

1960 births
Living people
Democratic Party members of the Washington House of Representatives
People from Illinois
People from Anacortes, Washington
School board members in Washington (state)
Women state legislators in Washington (state)
21st-century American politicians
21st-century American women politicians